O-Cedar is a brand of mechanical and power cleaning products which are rebranded Vileda products. O-Cedar was acquired by Freudenberg Household Products in 2003.

The O-Cedar brand was originated by Martin Marietta; it was purchased by Drackett in the early 1960s.  In 1965, Drackett was sold to Bristol-Myers Squibb, who in turn sold it in 1992 to S. C. Johnson & Son. Johnson sold the brand to Vining Industries, forming O-Cedar/Vining Household Products. Vining was acquired by Freudenberg in 2003.

References

External links
O-Cedar website

Home appliance manufacturers of the United States